The 22651/22652 MGR Chennai Central - Palakkad Superfast Express is a daily express train between MGR Chennai Central (MAS) and Palakkad Junction railway station (PGT) by Southern Railways via Palani. This is the only train that connects Palani, Udumalaipettai & Pollachi with the state capital Chennai.

History
In the beginning it ran between Chennai Central and Palani. Then it had been extended up to Pollachi Junction as a special train between Palani and Pollachi. In the 2017 it had been extended up to Palakkad Junction by serving two states Tamil Nadu and Kerala.

Route
The train operates from Chennai Central to Palakkad Junction via Tiruvallur, Arakkonam Jn, Katpadi, Jolarpettai, Morappur , Salem Jn, Rasipuram, Namakkal, Mohanur, Karur Jn, Dindigul Jn, Akkaraipatti, Oddanchatram, Chatrapatti, Palani, Udumalpet, Pollachi Jn and Palakkad Town.

Timings

This train is a daily service train with the following departures and arrivals at some of these stations:-

Coach composition

 1 AC First Class
 2 AC Two Tier
 2 AC Three Tier
 11 Sleeper coaches
 1 Non-AC Sitting coach
 2 General Unreserved
 2 Second-class Luggage/parcel van
It runs with ICF-CBC coaches (Green indicating Electric locomotive and Yellow indicating colour of the coach)

Locomotive
From Palakkad to Dindigul and vice versa, the locomotive used is GOC WDG3A diesel locomotive, as the route is not electrified. From Dindigul to Chennai Central,  RPM WAP7 hauls the train.

Starting from September 24, 2022, this train will be converted from Electric-Diesel locomotive journey to a fully complete Electric locomotive journey since the Palani-Dindigul line got completely electrified and CRS Inspection was successfully completed.

References

Transport in Chennai
Rail transport in Tamil Nadu
Express trains in India
Railway services introduced in 2013
Named passenger trains of India